Peter Marks is an American hematologist oncologist serving as the director of the Center for Biologics Evaluation and Research within the Food and Drug Administration. He was appointed to the position in 2016 after previously serving as deputy director. He has two children a daughter and a son. Dr. Marks resides in Washington, D.C. with his wife.

Education 
Marks earned a Bachelor of Science degree from Columbia University, followed by a Doctor of Medicine and PhD in cell and molecular biology from New York University in the lab of Fredrick R. Maxfield. As an undergraduate, he volunteered at Mount Sinai St. Luke's in New York City, where he worked in the radioimmunoassay lab. He completed an internal medicine residency and Oncology training at the Brigham and Women's Hospital.

Career 
After completing his training, Marks worked at the Brigham and Women's Hospital as a clinician-scientist, and later served as Clinical Director of Hematology. He then worked in the pharmaceutical industry, where he worked on the development of hematology and oncology products. He later managed the Adult Leukemia Service at Yale University and served as the Chief Clinical Officer of the Yale New Haven Hospital Cancer Center. Marks joined the Center for Biologics Evaluation and Research as deputy director in 2012, and was promoted to director in 2016.

In May 2020, he was selected to serve as a member of the White House Coronavirus Task Force, although he left a few days later over concerns that his participation would represent a conflict with his position at FDA. Marks also played a role in establishing Operation Warp Speed, a partnership between the federal government and various private companies to develop a COVID-19 vaccine, but left the project in May 2020 shortly after it was launched because Marks believed he would be more useful in his role as chief regulator of vaccines as the Director of FDA's Center for Biologics Evaluation and Research. In 2021, Marks served as a plenary speaker at the State of the Science Research Summit.

References 

American oncologists
Columbia University alumni
New York University alumni
New York University Grossman School of Medicine alumni
Yale University faculty
Food and Drug Administration people
Living people
Year of birth missing (living people)